Mario Kart Live: Home Circuit is a 2020 racing mixed reality game. It is the fifteenth installment in the Mario Kart series, announced in celebration of the 35th anniversary of the Super Mario franchise. It was developed by Velan Studios and published by Nintendo released on October 16, 2020 for the Nintendo Switch. Its toy radio-controlled cars race around the player's home, streaming video from their onboard cameras into the video game. It received favorable reviews with 1.27 million copies sold worldwide.

Gameplay 
Players build racing playsets around the house. The radio controlled cars are equipped with video cameras, controlled via the Nintendo Switch. The track has many traditional Mario Kart items. The game supports up to 4 players, either human or AI. The Grand Prix mode has the player race against Bowser Jr. and the Koopalings, and unlocks new customization options and costumes for the playable characters. The level creation in Home Circuit is performed by placing guidance arrows along four gates to make checkpoints which advance the player through the five-lap race.

Development 
Velan Studios developed the mixed reality prototype for Home Circuit, and demonstrated it to Nintendo staff, who were "thrilled" with "its potential". The game was primarily developed by Velan Studios, in collaboration with Nintendo EPD's Production Group No. 4, Nintendo European Research & Development and Nintendo PTD.

Home Circuit was revealed in a Nintendo Direct on September 3, 2020, to celebrate the Super Mario franchise's 35th anniversary, where it was scheduled for release on October 16, 2020. A toy set featuring Mario and another set featuring Luigi, including their respective drivers, four gates, arrow signs, and a charging cable, were also announced shortly after the Direct, and pre-orders became available shortly after.

Velan Studios stated that the controls were designed to be easy to understand, while remaining faithful to the Mario Kart series.

Reception 

Soon after the game's reveal, Ollie Barder of Forbes praised the concept, saying he "practically jumped for joy" at the trailer. The game received "generally favorable" reviews, according to review aggregator Metacritic. Within its first week of release in Japan, 73,918 copies were sold, making it the best-selling retail game of the week in the country. It was nominated for the category of Best Family at The Game Awards 2020.

References

External links
Official website

2020 video games
H
Mario racing games
Nintendo Switch games
Nintendo Switch-only games
Nintendo toys
Radio-controlled car racing video games
Video games developed in the United States
Video games scored by Ryo Nagamatsu
Toys-to-life games
Augmented reality games
Super Mario Bros. 35th Anniversary
D.I.C.E. Award for Racing Game of the Year winners
Multiplayer and single-player video games
Velan Studios games